Galeazzo Sabbatini (1597–1662) was an Italian composer and music theorist, born in Pesaro, Italy.
Sabbatini studied with Vincenzo Pellegrini, a canon who worked at the local cathedral as musician. He was elected to succeed Pellegrini in 1626 and in 1641. From 1630 to 1639 he was chapel master (maestro di cappella) to the Duke of Mirandola.

Galeazzo's principal works on the theory of music were a treatise on continuo playing, published in 1628 and a method of tuning. As a composer he was less known and played and most of his compositions consisted of motets and madrigals.

Works, editions and recordings
Works
 Sabbatini, G. Regola Facile e Breve per Sonare Sopra il Basso Continuo.. Venezia, 1628.
 Sabbatini, G. Il Secondo Libro de Madrigali. Concertati a Due, Tre, et Quattro, Voci.
 Sabbatini, G. Sacrarum Laudum Musicis Conceptibus. Contextarum Binis, Ternis, Quaternis, Quinisq[ue] Vocibus ad Organum concinendarum Liber Secundus. Opus Septimum.
Recordings
 Duets: Udite, o selve. Fulmina da la bocca. Emma Kirkby and Judith Nelson L'Oiseau-Lyre 436 861-2 1980.
 Congregavit Dominus aquas for soprano and bc. Recording on collection Amorous in Music: William Cavendish in Antwerp. Angharad Gruffydd Jones - soprano Concordia, Mark Levy Etcetera 2006

References

1597 births
1662 deaths
17th-century Italian composers
Italian male composers
Italian music theorists
17th-century male musicians